The 2018 Ontario general election was held on June 7, 2018, to elect the 124 members of the 42nd Parliament of Ontario. The Progressive Conservative Party of Ontario, led by Doug Ford, won 76 of the 124 seats in the legislature and formed a majority government. The Ontario New Democratic Party, led by Andrea Horwath, formed the Official Opposition. The Ontario Liberal Party, led by incumbent Premier Kathleen Wynne, lost official party status in recording both the worst result in the party's 161-year history and the worst result for any incumbent governing party in Ontario. The Green Party of Ontario won a seat for the first time in their history, while the Trillium Party of Ontario lost its single seat gained by a floor-crossing during the 41st Parliament.

Background

Redistribution of seats
The Electoral Boundaries Act, 2015 increased the number of electoral districts from 107 to 122, following the boundaries set out by the federal 2013 Representation Order for Ontario, while preserving the special boundaries of the 11 seats in Northern Ontario set out in the 1996 redistribution.

The Far North Electoral Boundaries Commission, appointed in 2016, recommended the creation of the additional districts of Kiiwetinoong and Mushkegowuk—James Bay, carved out from the existing Kenora—Rainy River and Timmins—James Bay ridings, which accordingly raised the total number of seats to 124. This was implemented through the Representation Statute Law Amendment Act, 2017.

The new districts have been criticized as undemocratic, as they have a population of around 30,000 people compared with over 120,000 people in some southern Ontario constituencies. National Post columnist Josh Dehaas suggested that the small population sizes of the ridings might violate the Canadian Charter of Rights and Freedoms.

In September 2017, a research firm analyzed the impact of redistribution if the boundaries had been in effect for the previous election.

Change of fixed election date
Under legislation passed in 2005, Ontario elections were to be held on "the first Thursday in October in the fourth calendar year following polling day in the most recent general election", subject to the Lieutenant-Governor of Ontario's power to call an election earlier. As the current government had a majority, the passage of a non-confidence motion was not a likely option for calling an early election, though Premier Kathleen Wynne stated in June 2015 that she would likely advise to dissolve the Legislature in spring 2018 rather than in October of that year in order to avoid any conflict with municipal elections and take advantage of better weather and longer days.

To put this on a statutory footing, in October 2016 Attorney General of Ontario Yasir Naqvi introduced a bill in the Legislative Assembly which, in part, included moving the election date to "the first Thursday in June in the fourth calendar year following polling day in the most recent general election", and it came into effect in December 2016.

Prelude to campaign
The Ontario Liberal Party attempted to win their fifth consecutive general election, dating back to 2003. The Progressive Conservative Party of Ontario won their first election since 1999, and the Ontario New Democratic Party attempted to win their second election (having previously won in 1990). Numerous other extra-parliamentary political parties also vied for votes.

The Liberals under Kathleen Wynne headed into the 2018 campaign trailing far behind the Progressive Conservatives, led by former Toronto City Councillor Doug Ford. The Liberals' standing with voters had been badly hurt when they partially privatized Hydro One in 2015, after campaigning against it in the 2014 election, as well as rising criticism over "ballooning provincial debt, high electricity prices and costly, politically expedient decisions". In early April, the CBC published their analysis of aggregate polls showing that Ford and the Progressive Conservatives were ahead of the other parties averaging 42.1% support, compared to 27.2% for the governing Liberals, 23.4% for the NDP and 5.7% for the Greens and with 11 Liberal MPPs announcing they would not be running for re-election or having already resigned their seats in the months leading up to the election.

According to Wynne, voters were offered a "stark choice", between "cutting and removing supports from people" with "billions in cuts", which she alleged the Progressive Conservatives would do if they won the election, and expanding investments in social programs such as prescription drugs and childcare, which the Liberal platform promised.

In March 2018, the Liberals tabled a pre-election budget in the provincial legislature which promised billions of dollars in new spending for free childcare and expanded coverage for dental care but replaced the government's previous balanced budget with a $6.7 billion deficit projected to last until 2024–2025. PC leader Doug Ford called the budget a "spending spree".

Mood of the voters
According to Toronto Star columnist Susan Delacourt, voters were motivated by a desire for changesuch desire being more driven by emotion than by ideologyand one researcher estimated that more than half of the electorate was undecided in who they were likely to vote for. The Huffington Post reported that half of voters were basing their vote intentions on how best to block the party they oppose.

In February 2018, Campaign Research conducted a gap analysis on voter intentions in Ontario, and determined the following:

Events leading up to the election (2014–2018)

Campaign period

Issues

Party slogans

Endorsements

Candidates

Candidate nominations 
In February 2018, the PC leadership overturned the nomination of candidates Karma Macgregor in Ottawa West—Nepean and Thenusha Parani in Scarborough Centre because of irregularities and allegations of ballot stuffing at their nomination meetings. Both candidates denied these claims. The nomination meetings were reorganized, and both candidates lost the nomination at those meetings. However, the PC leadership decided not to overturn the nomination meeting's result in Hamilton West—Ancaster—Dundas, where a similar situation took place, because of an ongoing police investigation on this situation.

In March 2018, the NDP nominated Lyra Evans as their candidate in Ottawa—Vanier. Evans was the first openly transgender candidate nominated by a major party to run in an Ontario general election.

Incumbents not running for reelection

Results

Elections Ontario used electronic vote tabulator machines from Dominion Voting Systems for counting the ballots. This election was the first time Ontario used vote counting machines for a provincial election, although tabulators have been used in Ontario civic elections for more than 20 years, and also in a 2016 by-election in Whitby-Oshawa.
The original paper ballots marked by voters will be kept for a year along with the digital scans of each ballot by the tabulator.

Synopsis of results

Detailed results

|-
! colspan=2 rowspan=2 | Political party
! rowspan=2 | Party leader
! colspan=5 | MPPs
! colspan=3 | Votes
|-
! Candidates
!2014
!Dissol.
!2018
!±
!#
!%
! ± (pp)

|style="text-align:left;"|Doug Ford
|124
|28
|27
|76
|48
|2,326,523
|40.19%
|9.08

|style="text-align:left;"|Andrea Horwath
|124
|21
|18
|40
|19
|1,929,966
|33.34%
|9.68

|style="text-align:left;"|Kathleen Wynne
|124
|58
|55
|7
|51
|1,124,346
|19.42%
|19.10

|style="text-align:left;"|Mike Schreiner
|124
|–
|–
|1
|1
|264,519
|4.57%
|0.31

|style="text-align:left;"|Allen Small
|117
|–
|–
|–
|–
|42,822
|0.74%
|0.04

|style="text-align:left;"|Greg Vezina
|42
|–
|–
|–
|–
|16,146
|0.28%
|0.20

| colspan="2" style="text-align:left;"|Independents and no affiliation
|32
|–
|2
|–
|–
|8,226
|0.14%
|0.06

|style="text-align:left;"|Bob Yaciuk
|26
|–
|1
|–
|–
|8,091
|0.14%
|0.13

|style="text-align:left;"|Trevor Holliday
|10
|–
|–
|–
|–
|5,912
|0.10%
|0.08

|style="text-align:left;"|Brad Harness
|10
|–
|–
|–
|–
|2,682
|0.05%
|

|style="text-align:left;"|Paul McKeever
|14
|–
|–
|–
|–
|2,565
|0.04%
|0.20

|style="text-align:left;"|Jason Tysick
|5
|–
|–
|–
|–
|2,316
|0.04%
|

|style="text-align:left;"|Yuri Duboisky
|16
|–
|–
|–
|–
|2,199
|0.04%
|0.03

|style="text-align:left;"|Dave McKee
|12
|–
|–
|–
|–
|1,471
|0.03%
|0.01

|style="text-align:left;"|Bahman Yazdanfar
|5
|–
|–
|–
|–
|1,239
|0.02%
|0.01

|style="text-align:left;"|Queenie Yu
|3
|–
|–
|–
|–
|1,078
|0.02%
|

|style="text-align:left;"|Joshua E. Eriksen
|3
|–
|–
|–
|–
|802
|0.01%
|

|style="text-align:left;"|Daryl Christoff
|3
|–
|–
|–
|–
|634
|0.01%
|

|style="text-align:left;"|Hilton Milan
|5
|–
|–
|–
|–
|631
|0.01%
|

|style="text-align:left;"|Kevin Clarke
|6
|–
|–
|–
|–
|628
|0.01%
|0.01

|style="text-align:left;"|vacant
|2
|–
|–
|–
|–
|386
|0.01%
|

|style="text-align:left;"|Ken Ranney
|2
|–
|–
|–
|–
|340
|0.01%
|

|style="text-align:left;"|Patrick Knight
|2
|–
|–
|–
|–
|321
|0.01%
|

|style="text-align:left;"|Paul Figueiras
|2
|–
|–
|–
|–
|256
|–
|0.02

|style="text-align:left;"|Arthur Smitherman
|3
|–
|–
|–
|–
|215
|–
|

|style="text-align:left;"|Wasyl Luczkiw
|2
|–
|–
|–
|–
|191
|–
|

|style="text-align:left;"|Derrick Matthews
|2
|–
|–
|–
|–
|176
|–
|

|style="text-align:left;"|John Turmel
|2
|–
|–
|–
|–
|112
|–
|

|style="text-align:left;"|Abu Alam
|2
|–
|–
|–
|–
|67
|–
|

| style="text-align:left;" colspan="4"|Vacant
|4
| colspan="5"|
|-
|colspan="8" style="text-align:left;"|Blank and invalid ballots
|align="right"|61,426
|align="right"|1.06
|align="right"|
|-style="background:#E9E9E9;"
|colspan="3" style="text-align:left;"|Total
|825
|107
|107
|124
|
|5,806,286
|100.00%
|
|-style="background:#E9E9E9;"
|colspan="8" style="text-align:left;"|Registered voters / turnout
|10,246,066
|56.67%
|5.38
|}

Summary analysis

Regional analysis

Most marginal 2-way and 3-way contests

Significant results among independent and minor party candidates
Those candidates not belonging to a major party, receiving more than 1,000 votes in the election, are listed below:

Opinion polls

Campaign period

Best Premier and Party Leader Approval Ratings

Major Regional Polls – Toronto

Pre-campaign period

References

Further reading

External links
Elections Ontario

 
Ontario 42nd
2018 in Ontario
2018
June 2018 events in Canada